Park Yeong-gyu (born 28 October 1953) is a South Korean actor. He is best known for his roles in Attack the Gas Station, in which he plays the owner of the titular gas station, and Break Out, in which he plays a corrupt politician.

Filmography

Film

Television series

Web series

Theater

Discography

Awards and nominations

References

External links 
 Crebig Entertainment | Artist | Park Yeong-gyu (박영규) Official website
 
 
 

1953 births
Living people
South Korean male television actors
South Korean male film actors
South Korean male stage actors
People from Daejeon
Seoul Institute of the Arts alumni